Green Haven may refer to:

Places in the United States:
 Green Haven, Maryland
 Green Haven, Michigan
 Green Haven Correctional Facility, a maximum security prison in New York